This is a list of members of the Senate of Northern Ireland.

Elected Senators

Senators ex officio

Lord Mayor of Belfast

Mayor of Londonderry

Alphabetical index

References

 
Senate of Northern Ireland
Senate